Teldenia pura is a moth in the family Drepanidae. It was described by Warren in 1899. It is found in New Guinea and on Goodenough Island, Fergusson Island and Admiralty Island.

The length of the forewings is 11–13 mm for males and 9.5–15 mm for females.

References

Moths described in 1899
Drepaninae